St. Mary's Monastery Church is a monastery church in Lubonjë, Korçë County, Albania. It is a Cultural Monument of Albania.

References

Cultural Monuments of Albania
Churches in Korçë County
Churches in Albania